Agnė Simonavičiūtė is a Lithuanian female balloonist and FAI women's vice world champion.

In 2014 Simonavičiūtė won bronze at 1st FAI Women's World Championships in Leszno, Poland. In 2017 Simonavičiūtė won silver at 4th FAI Women's World Championships in Leszno. In 2018 she won silver at 3rd FAI Women's World Hot Air Balloon Championship in Nałęczów, Poland.

She also participated in 2014 2nd FAI World Junior Hot Air Ballooning Championships where she finished 14th in open gender classification.

References 

Living people
Sportspeople from Kaunas
Lithuanian balloonists
Year of birth missing (living people)